The 2017 Buffalo Bulls football team represented the University at Buffalo in the 2017 NCAA Division I FBS football season. The Bulls were led by third-year head coach Lance Leipold and played their home games at University at Buffalo Stadium as members of the East Division of the Mid-American Conference. The Bulls finished the season 6–6, 4–4 in MAC play to finish in a tie for third place in the East Division. Despite being bowl-eligible, the Bulls did not receive an invitation to a bowl game.

Previous season 
The Bulls finished the 2016 season 2–10, 1–7 in MAC play to finish in last place in the East Division.

Coaching staff

Source:

Season notes

Record setting game
On October 7, 2017, the Bulls and Western Michigan to score 139 points in a game that took a record-tying seven overtimes to settle. Buffalo lost 71–68. The game marked the highest-scoring FBS game, breaking the previous record set in 2016.

Bowl snub
On November 24, 2017, Buffalo gained bowl eligibility for just the third time in school history. The Bulls had previously made appearances in the now-defunct International Bowl in 2008 and the Potato Bowl in 2013, then were denied bowl eligibility after a game the Bulls were likely to win was canceled due to a snowstorm and never rescheduled in 2014. The loss of one bowl game compared to the 2016 season and the distribution of wins and losses across the Bowl Subdivision meant that, unlike previous years, there were three fewer openings than there were teams to fill them, and the Bulls were one of the three teams snubbed by all of the bowls.

Schedule
Buffalo announced their 2017 football schedule on January 23, 2017. In out-of-conference play, the Bulls will meet former Western Michigan head coach P. J. Fleck's Minnesota team, as well as the Lane Kiffin-led FAU Owls.

Source:

Game summaries

at Minnesota

at Army

Colgate

Florida Atlantic

at Kent State

Western Michigan

Northern Illinois

at Miami (OH)

at Akron

Bowling Green

at Ball State

Ohio

References

Buffalo
Buffalo Bulls football seasons
Buffalo Bulls football